This is a list of Norwegian television related events from 2015.

Events
5 June - Yvonne Nordvik Sivertsen wins the third series of The Voice – Norges beste stemme.
7 November - Singer Adelén and her partner Benjamin Jayakoddy win the eleventh series of Skal vi danse?, just three days after her 19th birthday.
27 November - 13-year-old guitarist Odin Landbakk wins the seventh series of Norske Talenter.

Debuts
 Skam (2015–2017)

Television shows

2000s
Idol (2003-2007, 2011–present)
Skal vi danse? (2006–present)
Norske Talenter (2008–present)

2010s
The Voice – Norges beste stemme (2012–present)

Ending this year

Births

Deaths

See also
2015 in Norway